Charly Coombes (born 27 December 1980 in Mountain View, California) is an American-born English singer/songwriter, musician and filmmaker.

Career
In 2004 Charly joined Sleaford band 22-20s, who had recently re-located to Oxford, as keyboard player;  the band released one self-titled album and supported Oasis during their 2005 tour before splitting up in 2006 (the band reformed between 2008 and 2013 without Coombes). Following the split of 22-20s, Coombes filled in for Supergrass' keyboard player Rob Coombes during the Supergrass Road to Rouen European and North American tours 2005/2006 and substituted for three gigs during bassist Mick Quinn's injury in September 2007. His most recent endeavour was Charly Coombes and The New Breed, who released three EPs. He was also a member of the bands Tumbleweed (who signed a deal with Polydor Records in 1998), Four Way Trauma and in 2006 Missing Pieces with Richard Walters. He accompanied Supergrass throughout 2008 and 2009 for the Diamond Hoo Ha World tour playing second guitar, backing vocals and percussion.

Coombes also directed and starred in the rockumentary Glange Fever released in August 2008 under the pseudonym Chas Harrison. The film follows the Diamond Hoo Ha Men, Duke Diamond and Randy Hoo Ha as they tour the country. In December 2008 he also put together a short film, only available on YouTube, about life behind the curtain on the Supergrass American Tour during July 2008.

In September 2013 his debut solo album "No Shelter" was released on CD, download & limited edition White vinyl. Coombes is set to release his second solo album "Black Moon" in September 2015.

Personal life
Coombes grew up in the Oxfordshire village of Wheatley but lived with his family in San Francisco, CA until the age of four. He is the youngest sibling of Supergrass members Gaz and Rob.

In March 2009, Charly married his girlfriend Rayana Macedo in Brazil. They currently reside in São Paulo.

The New Breed
In July 2009, Charly Coombes formed Charly Coombes & The New Breed, consisting of Coombes (lead vocals and keyboards), Jacob Roos (bass guitar and backing vocals), Dave Ashworth (guitars and backing vocals) and Reynaldo Migliavacca (drums). The band spent two months rehearsing Coombes' entire back catalogue and played their first gig at The Bullingdon Arms, Oxford on 25 September 2009.

The band played throughout the United Kingdom, United States and Brazil as well as in support slots for The Hotrats, Supergrass and Taylor Hawkins and the Coattail Riders. On 1 February 2010, the band released their debut EP entitled Panic. A second EP entitled Waves was released on 29 November 2010.

The band released their third EP, Noise Control in November 2011 in Brazil, and in England in Spring 2012.

Discography
Albums
22-20s (as part of 22-20s) (September 2004) No. 40 UK
22-20s Live in Japan (Live) (as part of 22-20s) (2005)
No Shelter (Debut solo album) (September 2013)
Black Moon (solo album) (2015)
Run (solo album) (2017)

EPs
Stolen (as part of Four Way Trauma) Sandman Records (April 2001)
05/03 (Live) (as part of 22-20s) (September 2003)
When The Night Comes (as a session player for Lazare) (April 2009)
Panic (Charly Coombes & The New Breed) (Feb 2010)
Waves (Charly Coombes & The New Breed) (Nov 2010)
Noise Control (Charly Coombes & The New Breed) (March 2012)

Singles
"Third Degree Burns" (as part of Tumbleweed) Turquoise Records  (August 1998)
"Such A Fool" / "Baby, You're Not In Love" (as part of 22-20s) (April 2003)
"Why Don't You Do It For Me?" (as part of 22-20s) (April 2004) No. 41 UK
"Shoot Your Gun" (as part of 22-20s) (June 2004) No. 30 UK
"22 Days" (as part of 22-20s) (September 2004) No. 34 UK
"Such A Fool" (as part of 22-20s) (January 2005) No. 29 UK

Compilations
Sport (as part of Tumbleweed) Appears on Ten Trucking Greats - Truck Fest 98 (September 1998)
Close To Love (as part of Four Way Trauma) Appears on Ten More Trucking Greats - Truck Fest 99 (August 1998)
Boy (as part of Four Way Trauma) Appears on LSCD - Local Sound CD (March 2000)
Such A Fool (as part of 22-20s) Appears on The Album (August 2005)

Coombes features on German dance/electronic DJ Ronski Speed's debut album, Pure Devotion; he appeared on the track "Out of Order".

See also
 Supergrass
 22-20s

References

External links
 

1980 births
Living people
English rock keyboardists
English male singers
English rock guitarists
English folk guitarists
English male guitarists
American emigrants to England
21st-century English singers
21st-century British guitarists
21st-century British male singers